Francis Glisson (1597 – 14 October 1677) was a British physician, anatomist, and writer on medical subjects. He did important work on the anatomy of the liver, and he wrote an early pediatric text on rickets. An experiment he performed helped debunk the balloonist theory of muscle contraction by showing that when a muscle contracted under water, the water level did not rise, and thus no air or fluid could be entering the muscle.

Glisson was born in Bristol and was educated in Rampisham, Dorset, and at Gonville and Caius College, Cambridge. Glisson is a well-known medical eponym; he was for forty years Regius Professor of Physic at Cambridge. He died in London. The Glisson family can be traced to present-day Somerset.

See also
 Fibrous capsule of Glisson

References

External links
 

1677 deaths
Alumni of Gonville and Caius College, Cambridge
British anatomists
Fellows of Gonville and Caius College, Cambridge
Regius Professors of Physic (Cambridge)
Original Fellows of the Royal Society
People from Dorset
1599 births